The Composite Superman is a DC Comics supervillain, an enemy of Superman and Batman. The character first appeared in World's Finest Comics #142 (June 1964) and was created by Edmond Hamilton and Curt Swan.

Fictional character biography

Joseph Meach
Joseph Meach was a diver who had fallen on hard times. In an attempt to draw publicity to himself, Meach set up a water tank on a sidewalk in Metropolis and dove off a building. Unbeknownst to Meach, the tank was leaking and Meach would have died if not for the intervention of Superman. Upon learning of Meach's misfortunes, Superman obtained a job for him at the Superman Museum, where Meach was employed as a janitor. Meach's bitterness did not subside and being surrounded by mementos of Superman's career directed his anger towards Superman. One night, as Meach was sweeping in front of a series of statuettes depicting the Legion of Super-Heroes, a bolt of lightning struck the display. The statuettes (which were actually miniature lifeless duplicates of the Legionnaires) unleashed an energy blast that struck Meach, endowing him with the combined powers of the Legion members. Determined to defeat Superman, Batman, and Robin, Meach used his shapeshifting power to turn his skin green and form a costume that was half of Superman's costume and half of Batman's costume. Calling himself the Composite Superman, Meach left a message in both heroes' bases to meet him on a mountain.  There, he told the heroes that if he was not allowed to join their team, he would expose their secret identities, which he had learned via telepathy. The Composite Superman then created situations for Superman or Batman to handle, but which he intentionally sabotaged to humiliate the heroes, then sorted them out himself. Superman and Batman's attempt to expose him by using robot duplicates failed, due to the Composite Superman's ability to read their minds. Just before Meach could reveal the heroes' secret identities, the powers he gained from the statues faded away. Meach tried to write down the secret of his powers in the Superman Museum, but his memory faded before he could finish (though he managed to write down about the lightning striking the statues, but nothing more).

A few years later an alien villain named Xan came to Earth to avenge his dead father, a criminal who had been imprisoned by Superman and Batman. Xan restored Joseph Meach's powers by recreating the original accident. Meach's memories returned and he used the powers of Sun Boy and Lightning Lad to destroy the statues of Superman and Batman, leading to investigation by the duo. This time, the duo were able to deduce their enemy's identity, as they checked the museum employees who were not around when the Composite Superman was sighted. The Composite Superman captured Superman and Batman by impersonating a chained Robin, then tried to kill the team by using his powers to simultaneously turn half of their bodies to anti-matter; Meach's powers wore off before he could accomplish this. Xan appeared and fired a lethal energy blast at the heroes with his Magna-Gun. A remorseful Meach intercepted the blast, dying instantly. A statue was made to honor Joseph Meach, saying that he "lived a villain, but died a hero".

Xan
Xan escaped from prison and traveled back in time to recreate the event that endowed Joseph Meach with his powers, but with himself obtaining the powers. Xan assumed the identity of the Composite Superman and displayed greater control over his powers and understanding over his weaknesses, such as timing his needed restorations of energy to maintain his power. Xan discarded the Composite Superman identity and created an original costume with the new name Amalgamax. Superman traveled to the 30th century to ask the Legion of Super-Heroes for assistance. Superman, Batman, and the Legion defeated Amalgamax by making him believe that the disease that killed his father had developed in him and that his excessive power was causing the disease to develop rapidly.

Composite
The Composite Batman's origin was reimagined as an early attempt of Professor Ivo's to duplicate the Justice League's powers by creating clones of the Justice League. It was only ever referred to as "Composite". Believing it to be a failure, Professor Ivo buried his creature in a field. The clones later revived themselves, merged into one being, and stole Superman and Batman outfits from a store, sewing half of each together. Acting as both Superman/Batman and their alter egos of Clark Kent/Bruce Wayne, the Composite creature kidnapped Lois Lane and Tim Drake in an attempt to live the lives of both of its counterparts. He was later attacking Metallo when Batman and Superman arrived, but the duo could not defeat him and he escaped. They tracked him down and told him if he wanted to be both of them, then go ahead. They told him of many crimes taking place and he could not decide whom to help first. Composite became unstable and ripped himself apart before they could help him.

Composite Man
Following the Zero Hour reboot of Legion history, the Composite Superman was removed from continuity. Legion of Super-Heroes (vol. 4) #68 introduced a new villain called the "Composite Man", a Durlan who had the ability to duplicate any Legionnaire's powers and appearance. Rather than the clean, split-down-the-middle appearance of the Composite Superman, the Composite Man had a shifting mixture of costume elements from all the Legion members. Both he and his sister had been given these abilities by the Durlan government to be weapons and resented this. However, while she chose to make her own destiny, he joined the Dark Circle to gain revenge on Durla.

Biography
On the planet Durla, there was a long cultural struggle between secular and religious movements. Before the formation of the United Planets, the Secularists of Durla created a program to produce living weapons through mutation. The goal was to acquire soldiers capable of not only mimicking the appearance, but also the function of any species.

When they lost their grip on power, the Secularists found their program deemed sinful by the theocratic government and the test subjects were imprisoned in crystals. During regular maintenance to keep the living weapons contained, one of the crystals was damaged and an unnamed Durlan mutant broke free, killing the entire priest class of Durla. The living weapon went in search of Durlan priest and Legionnaire Reep Daggle. When battling the Legion of Super-Heroes, the living weapon not only imitated the Legionnaires' abilities, but also parts of their respective appearances. The Composite Man met his end when Saturn Girl used her telepathy to shut down his mind, leaving him in a catatonic state.

Powers and abilities

Joseph Meach
In terms of abilities and raw power, the Joseph Meach version of the Composite Superman was one of the most powerful enemies Superman and Batman ever faced. He had all of Superman's powers, as well as those of Supergirl and the similarly-powered Mon-El and Ultra Boy. The Composite Superman also possessed numerous special powers, derived from various Legion members:
 the ability to grow to giant size (Colossal Boy)
 the ability to shrink (Shrinking Violet)
 the ability to divide into three people (Triplicate Girl)
 the ability to fire lightning bolts (Lightning Lad)
 the ability to generate heat and light (Sun Boy)
 the ability to make things super-lightweight (Light Lass)
 the ability to make things super-heavy (Star Boy)
 the ability to consume absolutely anything (Matter-Eater Lad)
 invisibility (Invisible Kid)
 the ability to inflate into a large ball (Bouncing Boy)
 the ability to stretch any part of his body (Elastic Lad)
 shapeshifting (Chameleon Boy)
 telepathy (Saturn Girl)
 12th-level intelligence (Brainiac 5)
 magnetic powers (Cosmic Boy)
 penetra-vision that could see through anything, even lead (Ultra Boy)
 the ability to transmute elements (Element Lad)
 the ability to phase through solid matter (Phantom Girl)

Composite
Professor Ivo's version of the character was shown to possess the powers of Superman, Batman, the Atom, the Elongated Man, and the Red Tornado.

Other versions
In Impulse #56, Crayd'l, a nanotech computer belonging to Bart Allen's archenemy Inertia, accesses Young Justice's files and uses information on Robin and Superboy to become a "Composite Superboy", with the half-and-half, green-skinned appearance of the original. Crayd'l intended to access information on the other members of Young Justice, but Impulse tricked him into downloading a music CD instead, turning him into Superboy's favorite rap artist.

In Superman/Batman #6, Hiro Okamura creates a spaceship in the form of a mecha version of the Composite Superman. In a more recent arc in Superman/Batman, a new Composite Superman/Batman was created when Mister Mxyzptlk merged the Supermen and Batmen of several alternate realities together. Startled to be joined together, Batman mentally exclaimed to Superman, "Clark, your mind races, I never knew"; Superman replies, "And yours, Bruce, is so dark". This ends at the battle's conclusion and all the Batmen and Supermen who did not "need to be here" were sent away, leaving only the normal DC Universe Superman and Batman.

In Superman and Batman: World's Funnest (2000), Mister Mxyzptlk fuses together Superman and Batman of the DC Animated Universe, in a black-and-white comic strip in the form of storyboard sketches.

The Silver Age Composite Superman is one of the "ghosts" in the empty "Planet Krypton" restaurant in The Kingdom: Planet Krypton #1.

In other media

Television
The Composite Superman made a cameo in the Justice League Unlimited episode "The Greatest Story Never Told". Unlike the comic, this "Composite Superman" is the product of a battle with the dark lord Mordru. It is actually a fusion of Superman, Batman, and Wonder Woman with the appearance of the Composite Superman, but with Wonder Woman's voice, resulting from some twisted spell used in the intense magical conflict. The spell was undone by the time Mordru was defeated.

Film
In the animated film Superman/Batman: Public Enemies, the Japanese Toyman built a mecha/ship to destroy the incoming kryptonite meteor. The ship's design (as in the comic) bears a striking resemblance to the Composite Superman.

Video games
The Composite Superman appears as a playable character in Lego Batman 3: Beyond Gotham, voiced by Travis Willingham.

Toys
DC Direct released a Composite Superman action figure in 2005, and a second one (based on the Superman/Batman Vengeance 5 version) in 2008.

Parodies
 The Cartoon Network series Robot Chicken has parodied the Composite Superman in several episodes:
 In "Easter Basket", a sketch about Christmas and Dragon Ball Z features the Composite Santa Claus (voiced by Christian Slater), a creature who is half-Santa Claus and half-Frosty the Snowman. The Composite Santa Claus, the Little Drummer Boy, and the Nutcracker were secretly hired by Mrs. Claus to overthrow Santa Claus and take over the North Pole, leading Santa Claus enlisting Goku and Gohan to help him. The Composite Santa Claus is killed when his snowman half is melted by the intense heat from an energy ball fired by Goku. The Composite Santa Claus's origin is shown in the episode "In a DVD Factory". A mad scientist (voiced by Seth MacFarlane) uses DNA samples of Santa Claus and Frosty the Snowman to create the Composite Santa Claus. The Composite Santa Claus shoots the mad scientist and his henchmen and goes on a rampage on Christmas. An anchorman reports that the Composite Santa Claus has been apprehended and is standing trial before a United Nations tribunal. In "Saving Private Gigli", the Composite Santa Claus is among the Robot Chicken characters assembled by Seth Green and Matthew Senreich to fight for Season 5 in the opening Saving Private Ryan parody of this episode. The Composite Santa Claus' snowman half is dissolved in water, while the Santa Claus half is bombarded by bullets. In "Fight Club Paradise", the Composite Santa Claus is one of the mad scientist's line of defense that the Robot Chicken had to fight through to rescue his wife. The Robot Chicken manages to defeat the Composite Santa Claus by beating him down the stairs with a baseball bat. In "Immortal", a sketch parodying The Cabin in the Woods, Composite Santa Claus is among those locked up in the cube cells.
 The Composite Superman appears in the Robot Chicken DC Comics Special III: Magical Friendship, voiced by Jonathan Banks. He is accidentally summoned by Batman and Superman via the Flash's Cosmic Treadmill, and the two run off, arguing whether he should be named the Composite Superman or the Composite Batman. The Composite Superman uses the Treadmill as part of his plan to rule the multiverse. The Composite Superman and Superman fight using their heat vision, but succeed only in killing innocent bystanders. Batman suggests Superman attack the Batman side of his opponent's body, as it is human and, therefore, vulnerable. Superman repeatedly kicks the Composite Superman in the groin, only to discover the Composite Superman has "super balls". The attack proves to be enough of a distraction to allow Batman to jump onto the Composite Superman's back and stab his Superman side with a kryptonite batarang. This weakens the Composite Superman, allowing Superman to defeat him with a punch to his groin. As he collapses in pain, Batman mocks him, saying "I hope you learned your lesson", only for Superman to suddenly snap the Composite Superman's neck, killing him.

See also
 List of Superman enemies
 List of Batman family enemies

References

External links
 Composite Superman at Comic Vine
 Supermanica: Composite Superman
 A more indepth look into Composite Superman

Characters created by Curt Swan
Characters created by Edmond Hamilton
Comics characters introduced in 1968
DC Comics aliens
DC Comics characters with superhuman senses
DC Comics characters with superhuman strength 
DC Comics characters who are shapeshifters
DC Comics characters who can move at superhuman speeds
DC Comics characters who have mental powers
DC Comics characters with accelerated healing
DC Comics extraterrestrial supervillains
DC Comics supervillains
DC Comics telepaths
Fictional characters who can manipulate light
Fictional characters with elemental transmutation abilities
Fictional characters who can duplicate themselves 
Fictional characters with density control abilities
Fictional characters with fire or heat abilities 
Fictional characters with superhuman durability or invulnerability
Fictional characters who can turn invisible 
Fictional characters who can turn intangible
Fictional characters who can stretch themselves 
Fictional characters who can change size
Fictional characters with X-ray vision
Fictional characters with nuclear or radiation abilities
Fictional characters with air or wind abilities
Fictional characters with ice or cold abilities
Fictional characters with absorption or parasitic abilities
Fictional characters with energy-manipulation abilities 
Fictional characters with electric or magnetic abilities